Anoplomus is a genus of tephritid  or fruit flies in the family Tephritidae found in Asia. Males court females with pheromone calling and special flight and ritualized movements. In some species small leks of males may display on vegetation. Many species feed on fruits, while some are known to feed on bamboos.

The genus is characterized by the presence of two spines on the mid tibia and the absence of pronotal bristles. They belong to the subfamily Ceratitinae and are closely related to Sinanoplomus and Proanoplomus. Species in the genus include:

Anoplomus cassandra (Osten Sacken, 1882)
Anoplomus nigrifemoratus Hardy, 1973
Anoplomus rufipes Hardy, 1973

References

Dacinae
Tephritidae genera